About Last Night (stylized as "About Last Night...") is a 1986 American  romantic comedy-drama film directed by Edward Zwick, and starring Rob Lowe and Demi Moore as Chicago yuppies who enter a committed relationship for the first time. The screenplay by Tim Kazurinsky and Denise DeClue is based on the 1974 David Mamet play Sexual Perversity in Chicago. The film received positive reviews. It was remade in 2014.

Plot
In Chicago, Dan Martin and Bernie Litko, two 20-something friends and colleagues, discuss their sexual escapades. Later on, Bernie and Dan's recreational softball team, sponsored by local bar "Mother's," plays against a local advertising agency and wins. Attending this game with her girlfriends is Debbie Sullivan, who works at the advertising company and is sleeping with her boss, Steve.

Debbie catches Dan's eye and they flirt at the beer keg. She and her friends, Joan and Pat, decide to attend the game's afterparty at Mother's, where Debbie again runs into Dan, with whom Pat flirts and Joan takes an immediate dislike to. They wind up back at Dan's apartment and sleep together, after which Debbie hastily leaves.

The next day, Dan calls Debbie at work "about last night," and asks her out on a second date, to which she accepts. Afterwards, they again wind up in bed together and spend the following day exploring the city, where Dan reveals to Debbie that his dream is to quit his job at a restaurant supply company and open his own restaurant. They begin dating more seriously and move in together, much to the chagrin of Joan and Bernie, who dislike each other as well.

As neither has ever been in a serious relationship before, they attempt to navigate cohabitation without much support from their friends. They experience much throughout their relationship: Dan being contacted by a former lover who is married with children, Debbie's boss Steve having difficulty accepting the end of their affair, Joan softening when she begins dating her new boyfriend Gary, a pregnancy scare, and Dan having difficulties with his boss, who wants him to stop providing supplies to the Swallow, an oldish diner owned by his client-turned-friend Gus.

Despite having told each other the “L Word,” Debbie and Dan's relationship becomes strained. It reaches a boiling point at a New Year's Eve party at Mother's, where Debbie witnesses a drunken Pat making advances towards Dan, and Joan discovers her boyfriend is married and returning to his wife. Joan tearfully asks Debbie to take her home, to which she agrees, despite Dan's drunken objections. Upon Debbie's return home, Dan says he's not happy, and ends their relationship. Debbie immediately moves out of their apartment and back in with Joan. Despite getting back on the dating scene quickly, Dan begins to regret his decision regarding Debbie.

After a few months he calls her and acts nonchalant; Debbie tells him to get lost and hangs up on him. He starts to lurk around Debbie's social outings, culminating in him telling her he made a mistake and misses her at the St. Patrick's Day celebration at Mother's. Debbie turns him down, saying, "You asked me to leave and I left" and that getting over him was the hardest thing she's ever had to do.

Hoping to move on with his life, Dan partners with Gus to revitalize the Swallow into an old-school diner, achieving his dream. That summer, at another softball game, Dan and Bernie see Debbie riding her bike through the park with Joan, who convinces her to go and talk to Dan. She approaches him and they both express regret at how their relationship turned out. As Debbie begins to turn away, Dan asks her out again and suggests they go to a great new place, but she suggests with a smile that they just go to "some old joint," signifying that she is aware of his new restaurant. As she rides away on her bike, Bernie convinces Dan to run after her, and the camera pans out to see Dan and Debbie passing through the park, hinting at their renewed relationship.

Cast
 Rob Lowe as Danny Martin
 Demi Moore as Debbie Sullivan
 James Belushi as Bernie Litko
 Elizabeth Perkins as Joan Gunther 
 George DiCenzo as Mr. Favio
 Robin Thomas as Steve Carlson
 Megan Mullally as Pat
 Sachi Parker as Carrie
 Michael Alldredge as Mother Malone
 Rosanna DeSoto as Mrs. Lyons (as Rosana De Soto)
 Catherine Keener as Cocktail Waitress
 Ada Maris as Carmen
 Joe Greco as Gus 
 Robert Neches as Gary

Reception

Box office
The film was a box office success, grossing $38,702,310 domestically. It was the 26th highest-grossing movie of 1986, and the tenth highest-grossing R-rated movie of 1986.

Critical response
On Rotten Tomatoes the film has a 61% rating based on 28 reviews. The site's consensus states: "About Last Night will perturb fans of the original stage play by sanding down its pricklier edges, but an amiable cast and sexual frankness make this a pleasantly grounded romantic comedy." On Metacritic the film has a score 70% based on reviews from 17 critics, "indicating generally favorable reviews." Audiences surveyed by CinemaScore gave the film a grade "A−" on scale of A to F.

Roger Ebert of the Chicago Sun-Times gave it 4 out of 4 stars, writing in his review that "About Last Night . . .  is one of the rarest of recent American movies, because it deals fearlessly with real people, instead of with special effects." The lead performances were especially praised, with Ebert writing "Lowe and Moore, members of Hollywood's "Brat Pack," are survivors of last summer's awful movie about yuppie singles, St. Elmo's Fire. This is the movie St. Elmo's Fire should have been. Last summer's movie made them look stupid and shallow. About Last Night . . .  gives them the best acting opportunities either one has ever had, and they make the most of them." Sheila Benson of the Los Angeles Times called it "Tender, marvelously well played (by almost everyone) and thoroughly engaging. When it comes to the current sexual skirmishes between men and women, screenwriters Tim Kazurinsky and Denise DeClue (Second City alumni) know every inch of enemy territory and take no prisoners." Vincent Canby of the New York Times gave it a mixed review, calling it "an occasionally bright, knowing look at the same singles scene that's been explored no less effectively by a number of other, very similar movies".

Soundtrack

The film's music soundtrack album was released on EMI Records. The album includes music by Sheena Easton, Michael Henderson, John Oates; as well as Jermaine Jackson, Bob Seger, Paul Davis and John Waite.

Personnel
 Sheena Easton - vocals (track 1 & 3)
 John Oates - vocals, guitar (track 2)
 Jermaine Jackson - vocals (track 4)
 J. D. Souther - vocals, guitar (track 5)
 Bob Seger - acoustic guitar, guitar, piano, vocals (track 6)
 Nancy Shanks - vocals (track 7)
 Michael Henderson - vocals, bass (track 8)
 Paul Davis - vocals (track 9)
 Eric Ambel – guitar, vocals (track 10)
 Manny Caiati – bass guitar, vocals (track 10)
 Scott Kempner – guitar, vocals (track 10)
 Frank Funaro – drums, vocals (track 10)
 John Waite - vocals (track 11)

References

External links

 
 
 

1986 films
1986 comedy-drama films
1986 directorial debut films
1986 romantic comedy films
1986 romantic drama films
1980s American films
1980s English-language films
1980s romantic comedy-drama films
American films based on plays
American romantic comedy-drama films
Films based on works by David Mamet
Films directed by Edward Zwick
Films scored by Miles Goodman
Films set in Chicago
Films shot in Chicago
TriStar Pictures films